Fikile Patrick Magadlela (13 December 1952 – 2003) was born in Newclare, Johannesburg South Africa. He started drawing on his parents’ walls from as early as he could remember. Raised from a loving home by his parents Arthur Magadlela and Mavis Magadlela.

Reading books his father bought and getting knowledge from older people. He dropped out of High school in standard 8 (10th grade) to work as a full-time artist. Magadlela was relatively self-taught but he spent many hours with fellow artists exchanging ideas and techniques.

Magadlela worked closely with artists such as Ezrom Legae, Solly Maphiri, Winston Saoli, Percy Sedumedi, Pietro Cuzzolini and Harold Jeppe who became his mentor, introducing him to art circles in Johannesburg.

His most renowned work was entitled “Birth of The Second Creation” a series of drafted, mystical landscapes showing an African man and woman in flowing drapery and overwhelming clouds.

Later Magadlela would do bolder landscapes with similar characters using more colour and poetry.
His first exhibition first solo exhibition was at the Goodman Gallery then owned by Linda Givon in 1978.

Berman Gallery 1992.
Retrospective at the UNISA Art Gallery 1995

Magadlela died 2003

References 

Fikile Magadlela, Fikile: A Retrospective Art Exhibition : Unisa Art Gallery, May 18-June 14 1995, Unisa Art Gallery, 1995.
A new travelling exhibition attempts to uncover "lost" South African art—art that is unknown in its own home, Mail and Guardian, Jeremy Kuper, November 2011.
Fikile Magadledla at Ifa Lethu,  retrieved and archived 11 December 2013.

External links
Example of Magadlela's art at art.co.za

1952 births
2003 deaths
Place of death missing
Landscape painters
People from Johannesburg
20th-century South African painters
20th-century male artists
South African male painters